Edward Walter Furlong (born August 2, 1977) is an American actor. He won Saturn and MTV Movie Awards for his breakthrough performance at age 13 as John Connor in James Cameron's Terminator 2: Judgment Day; which was followed by a mini-sequel, short attraction film T2-3D: Battle Across Time co-directed and co-written by Cameron with the same main cast. 

In 1992, he gave an Independent Spirit Award-nominated turn opposite Jeff Bridges in American Heart, and earned a second Saturn Award nomination for his work in Pet Sematary Two. He won a Young Artist Award for his performance alongside Kathy Bates in A Home of Our Own (1993) and appeared in Before and After (1996) with Meryl Streep and Liam Neeson. Furlong received acclaim for his starring roles in the 1998 motion pictures Pecker, co-starring Christina Ricci, and American History X, co-starring Edward Norton. He had significant roles in the comedy Detroit Rock City (1999) and the crime drama Animal Factory (2000).

Early life
Edward Furlong was born August 2, 1977 in Glendale, California, the son of Eleanor Torres, a youth-center worker, and Heinrich Bruno Wittig. Furlong is of Mexican descent on his mother's side, and has also described himself as "part Russian".

His mother's sister, Nancy Tafoya, and their half-brother, Sean Furlong, obtained custody of him for several years, including 1990–1991, when he began his acting career. Initially, the two served as Furlong's managers.

Career

1990s 
In 1991, Furlong began his film career as John Connor in Terminator 2: Judgment Day, a role that earned him an MTV Movie Award for Best Breakthrough Role and a Saturn Award for best young actor. He was discovered for the part by casting director Mali Finn while visiting the Pasadena Boys and Girls Club in September 1990.

He followed this role with a string of moderately successful high-profile films and independent films, sharing the screen with Meryl Streep and Liam Neeson in Before and After (1996); Tim Roth, Maximilian Schell and Vanessa Redgrave in Little Odessa (1995); Jeff Bridges in American Heart (1993); and Anthony Edwards and Clancy Brown in Pet Sematary Two (1992).

In 1993, he was featured in Aerosmith's music video for "Livin' on the Edge". He played the lead role of Michael Brower, a horror and videogame-obsessed teen in the sci-fi horror film Brainscan (1994). In 1995, he starred in the film adaptation of Truman Capote's The Grass Harp. He reprised his role as John Connor in the 1996 theme park ride T2-3D: Battle Across Time alongside Linda Hamilton, Arnold Schwarzenegger and Robert Patrick.

In 1998, he starred in American History X alongside Edward Norton and appeared in his first comedy role in Pecker, directed by John Waters. Of his title role in Pecker, Furlong stated, "It's true most of the characters that I've played so far are kind of like suicidal. Really dark roles, which I like. But I wanted to do something different and John gave me a chance to do that."

In 1998, he starred in the film Detroit Rock City. During filming, he met Natasha Lyonne whom he then dated. He played a young convict in Steve Buscemi's film Animal Factory (2000).

2000s
Furlong's career and stardom declined considerably after 2000, with most of his subsequent films being released straight to DVD. In 2001 he took a role in I Cavalieri che fecero l'impresa aka The Knights of the Quest, a little-seen film by Italian filmmaker Pupi Avati.  Furlong was expected to play John Connor again in Terminator 3: Rise of the Machines (2003); however, Nick Stahl was cast just before filming began.<ref>{{cite magazine |url=https://ew.com/article/2002/04/30/meet-terminator-3s-hot-new-star/|title=Meet Terminator 3'''s hot new star|date=April 30, 2002 |magazine=Entertainment Weekly |last=Bonin |first=Liane |access-date=November 10, 2019}}</ref> He later elaborated to have had a deal to reprise his role and was removed after the producers discovered his drug addiction.

In 2004, he appeared in a music video for Metallica's "The Unnamed Feeling", and played Jimmy in the low budget independent film Jimmy & Judy (2004), during which time he met Rachael Bella. The two became romantically involved and later married.  He played the lead in The Crow series' fourth film The Crow: Wicked Prayer (2005), alongside David Boreanaz and Tara Reid, which was planned for a theatrical release but upon release was widely panned by critics and audiences and was released to DVD after one week in limited theaters. He appeared in Night of the Demons, the 2009 remake of the 1988 horror classic, which was shot in New Orleans and released straight to DVD.

In 2006 and again in 2010, he appeared in five episodes of the television program CSI: NY as Shane Casey.

2010s

Furlong appeared in two scenes of Seth Rogen's film The Green Hornet (2011). Next he starred in This Is Not a Movie, an English-language Mexican film written and directed by Olallo Rubio and co-starring Peter Coyote and Edi Gathegi. He was featured as Fixer in the crowdfunded pilot Star Trek: Renegades.

In 2019, James Cameron confirmed that Furlong would be returning to reprise his role of John Connor. It was later reported that his facial likeness would be used via CGI in Terminator: Dark Fate (2019) with Jude Collie as a CGI stand-in, and he was involved in one day of filming for facial capture performance, as John Connor was killed off in the opening scene.

Other work
In October 1992, Furlong released an album in Japan called Hold on Tight, with a cover of "People Are Strange" by the Doors.

Personal life
When California's statutory rape law changed in 1994 to allow the prosecution of adult women who have sex with minors, his uncle Sean Furlong filed a complaint against Furlong's tutor Jacqueline Domac alleging rape, but was unsuccessful in having Domac prosecuted. In May 1999, Domac sued Furlong for domestic violence.

Furlong married Rachael Bella on April 19, 2006. The couple's son was born in September 2006. On July 8, 2009, she filed for divorce citing irreconcilable differences. Later in 2009, she sought to dissolve the restraining order she had filed, so that he could visit their child.  In 2012, Bella alleged in court documents that their six-year-old son tested positive for cocaine, which led a judge to rule Furlong's visits had to be supervised. 

Substance abuse and legal problems

Furlong has battled alcoholism and drug addiction throughout his career. He first went into rehab in October 2000. He said he was "on and off" hard drugs from 22 to 26 and adding that "I was a heroin and cocaine addict. It was really scary." and "I don't even think about (partying) anymore. It seems lonely now: running and clubbing and doing coke. I have nightmares about doing hard drugs. I'll wake up and I'm like, 'Did I relapse?'" In September 2009, Bella filed a restraining order against him after he allegedly punched her in a drug-fueled altercation. 
In 2010, he received three years of probation for violation of the civil protective order obtained by Bella. In October 2012, he was arrested and charged with felony domestic violence against his girlfriend Monica Keena. In November 2012, he was arrested for allegedly assaulting Keena. In January 2013, he was arrested and charged with misdemeanor battery against Keena. He was also arraigned on an outstanding misdemeanor warrant in connection with a misdemeanor domestic violence charge involving the same victim on December 12. In March 2013, he was sentenced to 180 days in jail for a violation of probation after he "used force" against his ex-girlfriend, and for violation of a protective order, prohibiting approach and contact with Keena. 
He was arrested again in May 2013 for assaulting his girlfriend and avoided a further prison sentence after agreeing to five years' probation, going to rehab for drug addiction for 90 days, and to undergo one year of domestic violence counselling. He had already served 61 days in jail.

Rehabilitation and reconciliation 

After his arrest in 2013, Furlong committed to rehabilitation. 

In February 2021, he reunited with his former American History X co-star, Ethan Suplee, on Suplee's podcast American Glutton'' to discuss Furlong's recovery from drug addiction and compulsive eating. At the time of publication, he was three years sober from alcohol and illegal substances. Speaking on his initial hesitancy to maintain sobriety, he said, "I genuinely was afraid of facing what I would be without all that, because I carried all that as who I was."  he is maintaining his sobriety and is attending virtual Alcoholics Anonymous Home Group meetings hosted over Zoom video conferencing.

Filmography

Film

Television

Music videos

Awards

References

External links

 
 
 

1977 births
20th-century American male actors
21st-century American male actors
American male actors of Mexican descent
American male child actors
American male film actors
American male television actors
American male singers
Living people
Male actors from Glendale, California
People from Glendale, California
American people of Russian descent